Visaginas  may refer to:

Visaginas, a city in Lithuania
Visaginas (lake), lake located south of the town of Visaginas in eastern Lithuania
Visaginas Municipality, one of the municipalities of Lithuania
Visaginas Nuclear Power Plant, planned nuclear power plant project in Lithuania
FK Interas Visaginas, Lithuanian football team from Visaginas